Dr K Puttaswamy is a Kannada writer, film critic, translator and an environmentalist. He hails from Varagerahalli in Ramanagar District. He is currently serving as an Assistant Director in Kannada Development Authority. He is known for his translation of Charles Darwin’s "The Origin of Species" to Kannada. He served as the Head of the Department of History of Sciences in Hampi Kannada University. His major areas of interest are Kannada language, literature, science and films.

He received the Karnataka Sahitya Academy Award in the category of science and cinema [2] for his contribution to Kannada language and science literature.

Biography 
Dr K Puttaswamy was born in Varagerahalli village in Kanakapura taluk, Ramanagar District, Karnataka. He is the son of Kempegowda and Siddhalingamma. He finished his primary education in Kanakapura and moved to Sumathi Jain High school in KGF. He pursued Bachelors of Science degree in Agriculture Sciences from the University of Agricultural Sciences, Bangalore. He later obtained a Diploma in Journalism from Mysore University. He is also awarded D.Lit from the Kannada University, Hampi. He currently resides in Bengaluru with wife, and two children.

KPuttaswamy’s book ‘Cinema Yaana’ has won the national award for Best Book on cinema. This is the first time a Kannada book on cinema has won the national award. ‘Cinema Yaana,’ a flashback into the 75 years of Kananda cinema, maps the journey of Sandalwood from various perspectives. It was brought out on the occasion of the platinum jubilee celebrations of the Kannada cinema. Puttaswamy said: "I am happy. It is the first time a Kannada book on cinemas has     received a national award. As the book chronicles the 75 years of Kannada cinema, I feel the award is also a recognition for Kannada cinema. I am happy that a person passionate about cinema has been awarded. I feel the award belongs to all the film journalists, for I have got inspiration and insights from their writings.’’

Books 
 Jeeva Sankulagala Ugama (1991), translation of Charles Darwin’s "The Origin of Species" to Kannada.
 Jeeva Jaala (1999), jointly with Environmental photography duo Krupakar-Senani.
 Bhuvanada Bedagu (2000)
 Janatheya Rajya, a translation of Jnanapith Awardee Beerendra Kumar Bhattacharya’s work "Yaaryungam" from Assamese.
 Aadhunika Vignaanakke Gandhiya Savaalu, translation of "Gandhi’s Challenge to Modern Science" originally authored by Prof. Sunil Sahasrabuddhe.
 Kiriyara sachitra vignaana vishwakosha
 D.Devaraja Arasu Chitra Kathakosha
. Daasyadinda Achege. Translation of Up From Slavery, An Autobiography of Booker T Washington

Awards 
 Jeeva Jaala – Karnataka Sahitya Academy award in Science category (1999)
 Cinema Yaana - Karnataka Sahitya Academy award in Sankeerna category (2009)
 Karnataka State Environment Award (2000) for lifetime contribution to Life sciences and Environment.
 Cinema Yaana has won the Swarna Kamala award (2010) at 57th National Film Awards, for its probingly critical introduction to Kannada cinema in its interconnections with Literature and theatre, history and society; with insightful analyses of the classics of Kannada cinema and assessments of individual contributions, often from beyond the borders of Karnataka; supplemented by excellent photographs and annotations; and extraordinary production values.
 Cinema Yaana (2009) – Pusthaka Sogasu First prize from Kannada Pusthaka Praadhikara for its production values
 Kempegowda Award (2011) from Bruhat Bengaluru Mahanagara Paalike(BBMP) under Administration category
Has been admitted to Hall of Fame by Public Relations Council of India for his contribution to the field of Public Relations
 Kuvempu Bhashabhaarathi Award for translation of Booker T  Washington's autobiography UP FROM SLAVERY into Kannada as DAASYADINDA AACHEGE 2018

Translations

Dr.K.Puttaswamy has translated many works into Kannada language. His translations include biographies, scientific literature among others.

Biographies translated from English to Kannada
 Charles Darwin
 Alexander Fleming
 Margaret Mead
 Martin Luther King Junior
 Florence Nightingale
Translation of two works of Mani Bhoumik to Kannada
 Devaru Emba Sanketha ("Code Name God")
 Cosmic Detective
Translation of Science Fictions to Kannada
 Kaala nowke, originally "The Time Machine" by H.G.Wells
 Maaya Manushya, translation of "Invisible Man" by H.G.Wells
 Bhoo Madyakke Payana, translation of "A Journey Into Center of The Earth" by Jules Verne
 Embatthu dinagalalli bhoopradakshine, originally "Around the world in 80 days" by Jules Verne
 Saagaradalli Saahasa, from "20000 leagues under the sea" by Jules Verne
 Translation of  "Ben Hur", a novel written by Lew Wallace.

Jury 

 BIFFES 2015 Asian category competition
 IFFI 2016, Goa - Indian Panorama category selection committee
 BIFFES 2017 Asian category selection committee
served member of NETPAC Jury member at 11th BIFFES, Bengaluru
IFFI 2019 GOA-Indian Panorama section jury committee member

See also

 Kannada
 Kannada literature
 Kannada poetry

References

Living people
Writers from Karnataka
Indian film critics
1957 births
Recipients of the Rajyotsava Award 2006